Madras Rubber Factory, commonly known as MRF or MRF Tyres, is an Indian Multinational tyre manufacturing company and the largest manufacturer of tyres in India. It is headquartered in Chennai, Tamil Nadu, India. The company manufactures rubber products including tyres, treads, tubes and conveyor belts, paints and toys. MRF also runs the MRF Pace Foundation, Chennai and MIDD - MRF Institute of Driver Development in Chennai.

History
Madras Rubber Factory was started by K. M. Mammen Mappillai as a toy balloon manufacturing unit in 1946 at Tiruvottiyur, Madras (now Chennai). In 1952, the company ventured into the manufacture of tread rubber. Madras Rubber Factory limited was incorporated as a private company in November 1960 and ventured into manufacture of tyres in partnership with Mansfield Tire & Rubber company based in Ohio, United States. The company went public on 1 April 1961 and an office was established in Beirut, Lebanon to develop the export market in 1964 and its current logo of the muscleman was born. In 1967, it became the first Indian company to export tyres to USA.

In 1973, MRF started manufacturing Nylon tyres for the first time. The company entered into with a technical know-how collaboration with B. F. Goodrich in 1978. The Mansfield Tire & Rubber Co sold out its share in 1979 and the name of the company was changed to MRF Ltd in the year. The company finalised a technical collaboration agreement with Marangoni TRS SPA, Italy for the manufacture of pre-cured tread rubber for retreading industry. MRF tyres supplied tyres to Maruti 800, India's first modern small car. In 1989, the company collaborated with Hasbro International, the world's largest toy maker and launched Funskool India. Also, they entered into a pact with Vapocure of Australia to manufacture polyurethane paint formulations and with Italian tyre manufacturer Pirelli for conveyor and elevator belt manufacture. During the year 2004–05, the product range of the company expanded with Go-kart & rally tyres and tyres for two/three wheelers.

Products
Tyres manufactures various tyres for passenger cars, two–wheelers, trucks, buses, tractors, light commercial vehicles, off–the–road tyres and aero plane tyres, MRF ZVTS and MRF Wanderers for cars and SUVs, MRF Meteor all terrain tyres, MRF Steel Muscle for trucks and buses.
MRF ZLX is the latest one which is well known for its comfort in passenger segment
Conveyor Belting – manufactures its in-house brand of Muscleflex conveyor belts.
Pretreads – MRF has the most advanced pre-cured retreading system in India. MRF forayed into retreading in 1970 and manufactures pretreads for tyres.
Paints - manufactures polyurethane paint formulations and coats used in automotive, decorative and industrial applications.also indigenous Air craft tyres like Su 30 MKI fighter for Indian Air Force.

Manufacturing facilities in India
 Kottayam Plant in Kerala
 Puducherry Plant
 Goa Plant
 Trichy Radial Plant in Perambalur District, Tamil Nadu
 Trichy Bias Plant in Perambalur District, Tamil Nadu
 Arakonam Plant in Tamil Nadu
 Tiruvottiyur Plant in Chennai, Tamil Nadu
 Medak Plant in Telangana
 Ankenpally Plant in Telangana
 Dahej Plant in Gujarat

The company also manufactures toys at its facility in Goa. The paints and coats are manufactured at two facilities in Chennai, Tamil Nadu.

Funskool

Funskool India was established in 1987 in collaboration with Hasbro toys, US. Funskool manufactures and markets toys, board games among others. It has a manufacturing facility in Goa, India. The company has manufacturing licenses for toys and games from Disney, Warner Brothers, Rummikub, Dora and Funskool also has partnerships with renowned toy brands Hasbro, Lego, Hornby, Ravensburger, Tomy Toys, LeapFrog, Siku, Jumbo, and New Bright for manufacture and marketing in India.

Motorsports

MRF Racing
MRF built its first Formula 3 car in 1997. MRF in collaboration with Maruti established the Formula Maruti racing, a single-seater, open wheel class motorsport racing event for race cars made in India. MRF Challenge is a Formula 2000 open-wheel motorsport formula based series organised by Madras Motor Sports Club in association with MRF. The latest season consisted of races organised at Madras Motor Racing Track, Chennai, Bahrain International Circuit, Losail International Circuit, Doha and Buddh International Circuit, Noida. MRF has sponsored Indian racing drivers including Narain Karthikeyan, Karun Chandok, Ashwin Sundar, N. Leelakrishnan and Raj Bharath.

MRF rally team
MRF have also been a long-running sponsor of an MRF rally team participating in the Asia-Pacific Rally Championship and Indian National Rally Championship. Associating with Czech car manufacturer Škoda, MRF Skoda is the three time reigning champion in the Asia-Pacific Rally Championship with Chris Atkinson winning in 2012, Gaurav Gill in 2013, Jan Kopecký in 2014, Pontus Tidemand in 2015 and Gaurav Gill again in 2016 and 2017. MRF also participates in Raid De Himalaya, the world's highest rally.

MRF entered the European Rally Championship in 2020, with WRC Hyundai driver Craig Breen and Emil Lindholm driving for the team.

MRF remained in ERC for 2021 and also joined several other rally championships. Craig Breen, along with Italian Simone Campedelli are set to participate in European Rally Championship. Campedelli, along with eleven-time Italian rally champion Paolo Andreucci and the 2017 ERC Ladies champion Tamara Molinaro will use the tyres while competing in the Italy Gravel rally championship. Emil Lindholm left ERC and instead will focus entirely on testing the tyres on the gravel roads of Finland. After the 2021 Rally di Roma Capitale, Breen was replaced by other Hyundai drivers, Jari Huttunen and Dani Sordo, as well as Nil Solans later on.

MRF entered Norbert Herczig, Simone Campedelli and the 2021 runner-up Efren Llarena for the 2022 campaign, with Llarena taking his first win during 2022 Rallye Azores.

MRF Motocross
MRF promotes a national motocross championship, a form of all-terrain two wheeler racing held on enclosed off-road circuits annually across several cities.

MRF Karting
MRF sponsors major karting championships in India. MRF is the first Indian tyre company to develop FIA approved karting tyres.

Cricket

MRF Pace Foundation

MRF Pace Foundation is a coaching clinic for training fast bowlers established by MRF with the help of former Australian Pace spearhead Dennis Lillee in Chennai, India. Through this program, young aspiring fast bowlers are trained in a special facility. Fast bowlers who trained with foundation and went on to represent the Indian Cricket Team include Javagal Srinath, Irfan Pathan, Munaf Patel, Venkatesh Prasad, R. P. Singh, Zaheer Khan and S Sreesanth. Besides Indian players, foreign players like Chaminda Vaas, Henry Olonga, Heath Streak and Australian fast bowlers Glenn McGrath, Mitchell Johnson and Brett Lee have also trained at the foundation. Sachin Tendulkar in his early days trained in the MRF Pace Foundation to become a fast bowler. Glenn McGrath was appointed director of the Foundation on 2 September 2012, replacing Dennis Lillee, who has held the post since its inception in 1987.

Endorsement
MRF has been the bat sponsor for many great cricketers of the game. Sachin Tendulkar, Brian Lara and Steve Waugh. Currently MRF is endorsed by Jerome Chinia and Virat Kohli. MRF has also sponsored Indian batsmen Rohit Sharma, Gautam Gambhir, Sanju Samson and Shikhar Dhawan.  and Mignon du Preez.

Previous endorsements
 Sachin Tendulkar – India. Conqueror, Genius, Wizard
 Virat Kohli – India. Conqueror, Genius. 
 Brian Lara – West Indies. Wizard, Wizard 400 {named in honour of the 400 not out he made against England at the Antigua Recreation Ground}
 Steve Waugh – Australia. Conqueror
 Gautam Gambhir – India. Genius
 Sanju Samson – India. Wizard
Shikhar Dhawan – India. Genius
Prithvi Shaw - India. Genius, Prodigy PS 100
 AB de Villiers - South Africa. Genius

Sponsorship
At IPL 2010, MRF sponsored moored balloons floating above the cricket grounds with a high-definition camera recording live actions of the cricket match. MRF joined as a global partner of International Cricket Council for 2015 Cricket World Cup. In 2017, MRF became the sleeve sponsor for the Premier League clubs Newcastle United, West Ham United F. C. and official tyre partner for West Bromwich Albion.

Awards and recognition
MRF won the JD Power Award for the record 11th time in 2014. The company has won several awards and accolades including the All India Rubber Industries Association's (AIRIA) award for 'Highest Export Awards (Auto Tyre Sector)', 'Top Export Award' from Chemicals & Allied Products Export Promotion Council (CAPEXIL) for 2009–10. In 2014, MRF was ranked 48th among India's most trusted brands according to the Brand Trust Report, a study conducted by Trust Research Advisory.

Anti competition practices 
In April 2022, the Competition Commission of India raided the headquarters of MRF along with other tyre companies like Apollo Tyres, CEAT and Continental Tyre at multiple locations. Earlier in February the anti trust watch dog had released a statement about fining these tyre companies a total of Rs 1788 crores (of which MRF fined Rs 622.09 cr.) for sharing price sensitive information among themselves to manage their cartelization of tyre prices for supplies to the public transport corporation of Haryana state. Earlier the All India Tyre Dealers Federation had complained to the Ministry of corporate affairs about this cartelization of these companies to increase the tyre prices. The ministry had then referred the case to the CCI.

See also
 CEAT (company)
 Apollo Tyres

References

External links
 

Companies based in Tamil Nadu
Manufacturing companies based in Chennai
Cricket equipment manufacturers
Tyre manufacturers of India
Manufacturing companies established in 1946
Indian companies established in 1946
Indian brands
Companies listed on the National Stock Exchange of India
Companies listed on the Bombay Stock Exchange
Indian companies established in 1960